Elections to North-East Fife Council were held in May 1992, the same day as the other Scottish local government elections. The election was the last for the North-East Fife District Council, as the council would be replaced on 1 April 1996 by the Fife Council unitary authority after the 1995 election.

Election results

Ward results

References

1992 Scottish local elections
1992